Beijerinckia indica is a nitrogen fixing, aerobic acidophilic bacteria from the genus of Beijerinckia.

References

External links
Type strain of Beijerinckia indica at BacDive -  the Bacterial Diversity Metadatabase

Beijerinckiaceae
Bacteria described in 1950
Martinus Beijerinck